Stefan Matzner (born 24 April 1993) is an Austrian track cyclist.

Major results

2013
 National Track Championships
1st  Scratch
1st  Madison
2nd Pursuit
2nd Points race
2nd Kilometer
2015
 National Track Championships
1st  Scratch
2nd Pursuit
2nd Omnium
2016
 National Track Championships
1st  Sprint
2nd Team sprint
2nd Madison
2nd Pursuit
3rd Scratch
2017
 National Track Championships
1st  Points Race
1st  Kilometer
2nd Pursuit
2nd Omnium
2nd Sprint
2nd Madison
2018
 National Track Championships
1st  Sprint
2nd Kilometer

References

1993 births
Living people
Austrian male cyclists
Austrian track cyclists
People from Korneuburg
Sportspeople from Lower Austria
21st-century Austrian people